XPP may refer to:
 Poplar River Airport, the IATA code for the airport in Canada
 XML Professional Publisher, a standards-based, high performance, content formatting and publishing application
 XML Pull Parsing, a method of parsing an XML document, StAX parsers are an implementation of a pull parser.
 eXtreme Processing Platform, a processor architecture
 XPP-AUT, a tool for solving stochastic, differential, and difference equations, amongst others. 
 X++, the programming language behind Microsoft Dynamics AX